Crichton is an unincorporated community within the Rural Municipality of Wise Creek No. 77,  Saskatchewan, Canada. It is located between Admiral and Cadillac on the historic Red Coat Trail, also known as Highway 13. Like so many towns along the Red Coat Trail, Crichton has become a ghost town with only one family remaining and many empty buildings scattered throughout the town site.

History

On July 25 to 29, 1913 a survey began by a man named David Townsend from Calgary, Alberta plotting out the new community. Residents of the community decided that the name of their community should be after Scottish poet and scholar, James Crichton born in Perthshire in 1560.

During its day as an incorporated settlement, Crichton had three grain elevators (all have been torn down), a school that has been moved to a nearby bible camp, a café and pool hall, a garage that still stands on main street, boarding house, a blacksmith shop, lumberyard, post office, livery barn, water tower (torn down in the 1960s), and a large warehouse attached to the general store. There were even a golf course and tennis courts built for the community, as well as a baseball diamond near the school site. Today Crichton has one resident, and a few scattered buildings sitting abandoned.

See also 
 List of communities in Saskatchewan
 List of ghost towns in Canada
 Ghost towns in Saskatchewan

References

Wise Creek No. 77, Saskatchewan
Unincorporated communities in Saskatchewan
Populated places established in 1909
1909 establishments in Saskatchewan
Ghost towns in Saskatchewan
Division No. 4, Saskatchewan